January Uprising may refer to one of the following:
 the 1863 January Uprising in Lithuania and Poland against the Russian Empire
 the 1918 Kiev Arsenal January Uprising, also known as the January rebellion
 the 1919 Spartacist uprising in Germany

See also
 January Revolution (disambiguation)